Vitaly Aleksandrovich Varivonchik (born 9 March 1972) is a Belarusian professional football coach and a former player.

Honours
Dinamo Minsk
Belarusian Premier League champion: 1994–95, 1995

Shakhtyor Soligorsk
Belarusian Cup winner: 2003–04

External links
 
 

1972 births
Living people
Belarusian footballers
Belarus international footballers
Belarusian expatriate footballers
Expatriate footballers in Finland
Expatriate footballers in Azerbaijan
FC Dinamo Minsk players
Association football goalkeepers
FC Starye Dorogi players
FC Vitebsk players
FC Dinamo-93 Minsk players
FF Jaro players
FC Slavia Mozyr players
FC Belshina Bobruisk players
FC Shakhtyor Soligorsk players
Shamakhi FK players
FC Gorodeya players
Belarusian Premier League players
Veikkausliiga players